Francis "Frank" Bowyer (10 April 1922 – 11 November 1999) was an English footballer who played for Stoke City.

Career
Bowyer was born in Chesterton, Staffordshire and played for Stoke-on-Trent schools before joining Stoke City's ground staff at 15. He signed professional forms in July 1939 just before the start of World War II and he played 28 matches in 1940–41 as also guested for Derby County during the war. He missed all of Stoke's 1946–47 season due to his national service. He was demobbed in February 1948 and made his Football League debut two months short of his 26th birthday some nine years after signing as a professional.

He was renowned for his powerful volley shot and he top scored for Stoke in 1948–49 scoring 21 goals which put him up there with the best in the country. He then handed in a transfer request which was accepted by manager Bob McGrory who wanted to swap him for Bolton's Willie Moir but Bowyer changed his mind and withdrew his request and he remained at Stoke for the rest of his career. He top scored again in 1949–50 with 15 then with 19 in 1950–51. Stoke under new manager Frank Taylor suffered relegation in 1952–53 and Bowyer was top goalscorer in 1953–54, 1955–56 and 1959–60 as Stoke failed to gain a return to the top flight. Taylor paid the price for failure and was replaced by Tony Waddington who deemed the 38-year-old Bowyer surplus to requirements and he was released which caused some controversy as he was only three league goals short of Freddie Steele's record of 140. He ended his career with three years as a player manager of Macclesfield Town.

Post retirement
He moved to Newquay with his wife where he became a school caretaker. He died in a hospital in Truro after a short illness in November 1999 aged 77.

Career statistics
Source:

References

1922 births
1999 deaths
English footballers
English football managers
People from Chesterton, Staffordshire
Stoke City F.C. players
English Football League players
Macclesfield Town F.C. players
Newquay A.F.C. players
Macclesfield Town F.C. managers
Association football inside forwards